London Live may refer to:

 London Live (TV programme), a long-running UK live music programme shown on Channel 4 and 4Music
 London Live (TV channel), a local television channel in London, England
 "London Live", a track on the 2001 So Far So Good DVD by Atomic Kitten
 London: Live, a 2009 live album by An Albatross
 London Live '68, a 1998 live album by Fleetwood Mac
 London beHofaah (London – Live), a 1995 album by Chava Alberstein

See also

 
 

 Live in London (disambiguation)